Luvanis S.A. is a private investment company headquartered in Luxembourg and specialized in the incubation and revival of long-dormant luxury brands, also coined as “sleeping beauties”.

History 
Luvanis was founded in 2009 by Guy de Lummen and his son Arnaud de Lummen, after the two revived French couture house Vionnet.

In 2007, the father-and-son duo reintroduced the first Vionnet clothing line since 1939, with Sophia Kokosalaki as creative director and Barneys New York as exclusive distributor. After the initial reboot, Arnaud and Guy de Lummen sold Vionnet to Italian entrepreneurs Matteo Marzotto, former CEO of Valentino, and Gianni Castiglioni, CEO and owner of Marni.

Building on their experience, the de Lummens incorporated Luvanis, focused on identifying and acquiring the rights to forgotten brand gems in order to reposition them and find partners or investors to fund their relaunch. The business model attempts to strike a balance between reasserting the brands’ heritage, and updating it for the present.

Over the years, Luvanis has constituted a portfolio of long-dormant ‘sleeping beauty’ brands composed of former luxury houses in fashion, shoes, leather goods, jewelry, perfume, and champagne, which had enjoyed decades of success before closing doors.

Brands selected will typically have received great recognition both in their prime (prizes at World's fairs, imperial or royal warrants) and later on, with for instance dedicated exhibitions (such as Paul Poiret or Charles James honored at the Metropolitan Museum of Art), or in some cases by becoming the object of a strong cult following.

Publicized revivals 
In 2009, Luvanis acquired rights over the luxury trunk maker Moynat. Established in Paris in 1849, Moynat was a peer to Goyard and Louis Vuitton, before disappearing in 1976. Luvanis introduced the revival opportunity to Bernard Arnault who bought Moynat via Groupe Arnault. Moynat reopened with a flagship store in Paris in December 2011, followed by shops in London, Hong Kong, Beijing, Tokyo, New York, Seoul, Taipei, Singapore and Dubai.

Luvanis also repositioned for revival the French trunk maker Au Départ, and the American leather goods company Belber. Luvanis sold Belber to the former owners of Alain Figaret and Delvaux, who released a new collection of bags and accessories in 2016, and assigned Au Départ to Asian investors, who released a new collection of trunks and bags featuring the signature monogram motif upon a launch on Paris' historic rue Saint Honoré in 2019.

In the wake of a landmark exhibition at the Metropolitan Museum of Art dedicated to the American fashion designer Charles James in 2014, Luvanis joined forces and trademarks rights with the designer’s heirs in June 2016, paving the way for the revival of the couture house. In September 2018, Luvanis revealed a new visual identity for Charles James, and put up for sale all the brands rights, which had been consolidated in the previous years.

In October 2014, Luvanis received extensive press attention when it announced the sale of the Paul Poiret brand, as well as of part of the house’s archives. In August 2015, after a long and careful selection process, Luvanis entered into an agreement with the South Korean luxury group Shinsegae International for the sale of Paul Poiret. Shinsegae officially confirmed the sale in January 2018. The house reopened with Belgian businesswoman Anne Chapelle at its helm, and Paris-based Chinese couturier Yiqing Yin as its artistic director. Poiret showed its first new collection in March 2018 after a 90-year hiatus.

Luvanis was the lead corporate sponsor of an exhibition on Mainbocher held at the Chicago History Museum between October 2016 and August 2017, which garnered more than 100,000 visitors. Luvanis announced plans to revive the couture house shortly after.

Notable brands 
The most notable long heritage brands currently or formerly part of Luvanis portfolio include the following:

Notes and references

Further reading 
 Zanon, Johanna (2018).  “Reawakening the ‘Sleeping Beauties’ of Haute Couture: The Case of Guy and Arnaud de Lummen,” in European Fashion: The Creation of a Global Industry, Regina Lee Blaszczyk and Véronique Pouillard eds., Manchester: Manchester University Press 2018.

External links 
 Official website

Luxury brand holding companies
Holding companies of Luxembourg
Companies based in Luxembourg City
Luxembourgian companies established in 2009
Holding companies established in 2009